This is a complete list  of churches in Venice classified by "sestiere" in which the city  is divided.  These are Cannaregio,  San Polo,  Dorsoduro  (including the Giudecca  and Isola Sacca Fisola), Santa Croce, San Marco (including San Giorgio Maggiore) and Castello  (including San Pietro di Castello and Sant'Elena). It also details the churches on the islands outside Venice.

San Marco

San Polo

Santa Croce

Dorsoduro 

Basilica di Santa Maria della Salute
Angelo Raffaele
Le Eremite
Gesuati (Santa Maria del Rosario)
Nome di Gesù
Ognissanti
Sant'Agnese
Sant'Andrea della Zirada
San Barnaba
St George (Anglican)
San Gregorio (deconsecrated)
Santa Maria del Carmini
Santa Maria della Visitazione
San Nicolò dei Mendicoli
San Sebastiano
San Trovaso
Lo Spirito Santo
Le Terese (deconsecrated)

Giudecca 
Il Redentore
dei Santi Cosma e Damiano deconsecrated
Santa Croce (deconsecrated)
Sant'Eufemia
Le Zitelle

Cannaregio 

Le Cappuccine 
Corpus Domini (Demolished)
Gesuiti (Santa Maria Assunta)
La Maddalena
Madonna dell'Orto
Sant'Alvise
Santi Apostoli
San Canciano
Santa Caterina (deconsecrated)
San Felice
Santa Fosca 
San Geremia
San Giobbe
San Giovanni Crisostomo
San Leonardo
Chiesa Luterana (Lutheran)
San Marcuola
Santa Maria dei Miracoli
Santa Maria della Misericordia (deconsecrated)
Santa Maria dei Servi (destroyed)
San Marziale
Santa Sofia
Scalzi (Santa Maria di Nazareth)

Castello 

Basilica di San Zanipolo
Ospedaletto
La Pietà
Sant'Anna (deconsecrated)
Sant'Antonin
San Biagio
San Domenico di Castello (destroyed)
Sant'Elena
San Francesco di Paola
San Francesco della Vigna
San Giorgio dei Greci (Greek Orthodox)
San Giorgio degli Schiavoni
San Giovanni in Bragora
San Giovanni Nuovo
San Giuseppe di Castello
Santa Giustina (deconsecrated)
San Lazzaro dei Mendicanti
San Lio
San Lorenzo (deconsecrated)
Santa Maria della Fava
Santa Maria Formosa
Santa Maria del Pianto (closed)
Santa Maria della Pietà
San Martino
San Niccolo di Bari  (destroyed)
San Pietro di Castello
San Zaccaria

Islands

San Michele 
San Cristoforo
San Michele in Isola

Murano 
Basilica di Santi Maria e Donato
Santa Maria degli Angeli
San Pietro Martire

Burano 
San Martino

Mazzorbo 
Santa Caterina
Santa Maria Valverde (destroyed)

Torcello 
Basilica di Santa Maria Assunta
Santa Fosca

San Francesco del Deserto 
San Francesco del Deserto

Lido 
Santa Maria Elisabetta
San Nicolò al Lido

San Lazzaro degli Armeni 
San Lazzaro degli Armeni (Armenian Catholic)

External links 

All the Churches of Venice - Architectural and historic descriptions of every church in Venice
Website listing and describing every church in Venice, churchesofvenice.co.uk

Venice
Churches
Venice